The Final Comedown is a soundtrack album for the film The Final Comedown (1972) by American jazz guitarist Grant Green featuring performances recorded in 1971 and released on the Blue Note label. It was the first soundtrack album released on Blue Note.

Reception

The Allmusic review by Brandon Burke awarded the album 3 stars and stated "Recommended for fans of blaxploitation soundtracks and early-'70s jazz-funk".

Track listing
All compositions by Wade Marcus
 "Past, Present and Future" - 5:16  
 "Fountain Scene" - 3:01  
 "Soul Food, African Shop" - 2:54  
 "Slight Fear and Terror" - 1:16  
 "Luanna's Theme" - 2:29  
 "The Final Comedown" - 3:28  
 "Afro Party" - 4:11  
 "Traveling to Get to Doc" - 1:41  
 "One Second After Death" - 1:40  
 "Father's Lament" - 2:49  
 "Battle Scene" - 6:46  
Recorded at A&R Studios, NYC on December 13 & 14, 1971

Personnel
Grant Green - guitar
Irving Markowitz, Marvin Stamm - trumpet, flugelhorn
Phil Bodner - flute, piccolo, alto saxophone, oboe
Harold Vick - alto saxophone, tenor saxophone
Julian Barber, Harry Zaratzian - viola 
Seymour Barab, Charles McCracken - cello 
Eugene Bianco - harp
Warren Smith - marimba, tambourine
George Devens - vibes, timpani, percussion
Richard Tee - piano, organ
Cornell Dupree - guitar
Gordon Edwards - electric bass
Grady Tate - drums
Ralph MacDonald - conga, bongos  
Wade Marcus - composer, conductor

References 

Grant Green albums
Blue Note Records soundtracks
1972 soundtrack albums
Drama film soundtracks
Albums arranged by Wade Marcus
Albums produced by George Butler (record producer)